Madison Kimrey is an American political activist from Burlington, North Carolina. Her focuses include youth involvement in politics, the humane treatment of animals, and women’s rights.  She has also been involved with petitions, including a petition to meet with North Carolina governor Pat McCrory. She spoke at a Moral Mondays event in North Carolina, and at the "We are Woman" rally in Washington DC.

Career
Kimrey's first encounter with activism was in Jacksonville, when a family had to pay extra for a family membership at the "Hands-On Children's Museum" because the museum argued they weren't "really a family." After she returned to North Carolina, Kimrey started to notice Pat McCrory and started going to "Moral Monday" protests.

Kimrey is also the author of the blog "Functional Human Being," which contains a collection of political writings, opinions, personal insights and occasional accompanying music video.

References

American political activists
2001 births
Living people
American feminists
North Carolina Democrats
People from Alamance County, North Carolina
People from Burlington, North Carolina
American abortion-rights activists
Activists from North Carolina
American political women
American women's rights activists
21st-century American women